Petroline may refer to:
 East-West Crude Oil Pipeline
 Mozambique–South Africa Oil Pipeline